Deng Zhong may refer to:

Deng Zhong (Cao Wei) (died 264), Cao Wei general
Deng Zhong (Investiture of the Gods), Investiture of the Gods character